Philippe Barrès (8 July 1896, Neuilly-sur-Seine, Hauts-de-Seine – 14 April 1975) was a French journalist and the son of Maurice Barrès.

He fought in World War I. 
He was a member of the editorial staff of the right-wing newspaper Le Nouveau siècle founded on 26 February 1925, along with Georges Valois, Jacques Arthuys and Hubert Bourgin.
He was a member of the short-lived Fascist party the Faisceau in the late 1920s.
During World War II, he lived in the United States and wrote for French language journals. He represented the Rally of the French People (RPF) in the National Assembly from 1951 to 1955. His son Claude Barrès joined the Free French Forces.

Books 
 La guerre à vingt ans – Plon, 1924
 Ainsi que l'Albatros Novel – Plon, 1931
 La Victoire au dernier tournant – Plon, 1931
 Sous la vague hitlérienne – Plon, 1934
 They speak for a nation Lettres from Frenchmen published in América – Doubleday Doran, New-York, 1941
 Charles de Gaulle. – Plon, 1941
 Sauvons nos prisonniers – Didier, New-York, 1942

References

1896 births
1975 deaths
People from Neuilly-sur-Seine
Politicians from Île-de-France
Rally of the French People politicians
Deputies of the 2nd National Assembly of the French Fourth Republic
French male non-fiction writers
French military personnel of World War I
French military personnel of World War II
20th-century French journalists
20th-century French male writers
Barrès family